Jarchlino  is a village in the administrative district of Gmina Nowogard, within Goleniów County, West Pomeranian Voivodeship, in north-western Poland.

The village has a population of 250.

Notable residents
 Klaus von Bismarck (1912–1997), Director General of the Westdeutscher Rundfunk, President of the ARD, the German Evangelical Church Assembly and the Goethe Institute

References

Jarchlino